Sphragifera sigillata is a species of moth of the family Noctuidae. It is found in Asia, including the Russian Far East, Japan and Taiwan.

The wingspan is 32–40 mm.

Subspecies
Sphragifera sigillata sigillata
Sphragifera sigillata taimacula Hreblay & Ronkay, 2000 (Taiwan)

References

Moths described in 1859
Hadeninae
Moths of Japan
Moths of Asia
Moths of Taiwan